Bonnay-Saint-Ythaire is a commune in the Saône-et-Loire department in the region of Bourgogne-Franche-Comté in eastern France. It was established as a commune nouvelle on 1 January 2023 from the merger of the communes of Bonnay and Saint-Ythaire.

See also
Communes of the Saône-et-Loire department

References

Bonnaysaintythaire